Lynn Aloysius Belvedere is a fictional character created by Gwen Davenport for her 1947 novel Belvedere, and later adapted for film and television.

Novel
Belvedere was written in 1947 by Gwen Davenport, and concerns an English housekeeper who goes to work for a dysfunctional American family to obtain material for a best-selling book.

In other media

Film
Three films featured the character, starring Clifton Webb as Lynn Belvedere:
 Sitting Pretty (1948), for which Webb received a nomination for Academy Award for Best Actor.
 Mr. Belvedere Goes to College (1949)
 Mr. Belvedere Rings the Bell (1951)

Harry and Tacey King hire Lynn Belvedere sight unseen as a nanny for their three young rambunctious boys, believing that "Lynn" is a woman. They are surprised that Lynn is a dapper older gentleman who has many skills and achievements. Belvedere declares that he detests children, but he quickly wins over the boys. Harry, however, is annoyed by Belvedere's superior attitude. After a number of misunderstandings and scandals, Belvedere writes a best-selling novel that exposes the secrets of the local residents.

Subsequently, he goes to college to complete a four-year degree in one year, and explores the phenomenon of growing old.

Television

Multiple attempts failed to bring the character to television; three pilots based on the Belvedere character were made, with Reginald Gardiner in 1956, Hans Conried in 1959, and Victor Buono in 1965. A successful television series first aired on ABC in 1985, with Christopher Hewett in the role.

In the series, Lynn Belvedere is hired by George (Bob Uecker) and Marsha Owens (Ilene Graff) as a housekeeper for their three children. They are surprised that Lynn is a dapper older gentleman. The three children are: oldest son Kevin (Rob Stone), daughter Heather (Tracy Wells) and youngest child Wesley (Brice Beckham). Wesley in particular develops a very close relationship with Mr. Belvedere. Being a cultured man with many skills and achievements (having even once worked for Winston Churchill), he also comes to serve as some sort of a "counselor" to the Owens clan, helping them solve their dilemmas and stay out of mischief. Each episode ends with Mr. Belvedere writing in his journal, recounting the events of the day (which is heard by the audience via his narration) with the Owens family and what he got out of it in terms of a lesson.

References 

Characters in British novels of the 20th century
Comedy film characters
Comedy television characters
Fictional butlers
Literary characters introduced in 1947
Fictional English people